Newton Case Brainard (December 26, 1880 – July 16, 1964) was an American banker and historian who served as Mayor of Hartford, Connecticut from 1920 to 1922. He graduated from Yale University in 1902.

He was a member of the Acorn Club, elected in 1915; he was also a member of the Connecticut Historical Society, of which he was president from 1953 to 1963.

The Hartford–Brainard Airport, in Connecticut, is named after him.

References

External links 
 
Connecticut Historical Society finding aid
Newton Case Brainard at Find a Grave

1880 births
1964 deaths
Connecticut Republicans
Mayors of Hartford, Connecticut
Yale University alumni
Historians from Connecticut